Vladimir Dragutinović (born 20 June 1967) is a Serbian professional basketball administrator and former basketball player and coach.

Post-playing career 
Dragutinović had a stint with Hemofarm as an assistant coach.

References

External links
 FIBA Europe
 Player Profile at eurobasket.com

1967 births
Living people
Basketball players from Belgrade
KK Borovica players
KK Budućnost players
KK Hemofarm players
KK IMT Beograd players
KK Partizan players
KK Rabotnički players
Point guards
BKK Radnički players
Serbian expatriate basketball people in Bulgaria
Serbian expatriate basketball people in Montenegro
Serbian expatriate basketball people in North Macedonia
Serbian expatriate basketball people in Turkey
Serbian basketball executives and administrators
Serbian men's basketball coaches
Serbian men's basketball players
Serbian sports agents
Serbs of Croatia